In combustion, Emmons problem describes the flame structure which develops inside the boundary layer, created by a flowing oxidizer stream on flat fuel (solid or liquid) surfaces. The problem was first studied by Howard Wilson Emmons in 1956. The flame is of diffusion flame type because it separates fuel and oxygen by a flame sheet. The corresponding problem in a quiescent oxidizer environment is known as Clarke–Riley diffusion flame.

Burning rate

where 

In deriving this, it is assumed that the density  and the viscosity , where  is the temperature. The subscript  describes the values far away from the fuel surface.

See also
Liñán's diffusion flame theory

References

Fluid dynamics
Combustion